Gohad State or Kingdom of Gohad was a Jat kingdom in India. It was founded by Jat King Singhadev II. The state was ruled by Bamraulia Jats.

History
After the death of Aurangzeb, Singhadev II established Jat rule in Gohad near Gwalior in 1711 and founded the Gohad kingdom. Bhim Singh Rana was the most famous ruler of Gohad. He defeated the Mughals and captured Gwalior, under his reign 331 forts were captured. Bhim Singh Rana also defeated the Marathas. After his death Chatar Singh recaptured Gwalior from the Marathas on 1780. He ruled from Gwalior till 1785. In 1785 Maratha ruler Mahadaji Shinde again captured Gwalior and also captured Gohad destroying the Jat kingdom temporarily. After Mahadaji Shinde's death 18 years later, Kirat Singh assumed power and became the ruler of Gohad. Kirat Singh exchanged the territory of Gohad with Dholpur in a treaty with the Marathas who were continuously attacking the Jat kingdom. He also gave up on trying to recapture Gwalior and gave it to the Marathas as part of the treaty.

Rulers
Singhandev II (1505-1524)
Devi Singh (1524-1535)
Udyaut Singh (1535-1546)
Anup Singh (1546-?)
Shambhu Singh (?-1604)
Abhaychandra (1604-1628)
Ramchandra (1628-1647)
Ratan Singh (1647-1664)
Uday Singh (1664-1685)
Bagh Raj (1685-1699)
Gaj Singh (1699-1704)
Jaswant Singh (1704-1707)
Bhim Singh Rana (1707-1756)
Girdhar Pratap Singh (1756-1757)
Chhatar Singh (1757-1785)
Kirat Singh (1803-1805)

See also
Dholpur State
Gohad Fort
Utila Fort

References

External links 
Gateways of Gohad Fort

Former states and territories of India
Jat princely states
States and territories established in 1505
States and territories disestablished in 1805
Medieval India
History of Gwalior